Mazzerelle is an ancient recipe typical of the Abruzzo tradition, widespread above all in the mountains, particularly in the Teramo area. it is listed as a traditional Italian food product (P.A.T.) by the Ministry of Agricultural, Food and Forestry Policies. Mazzarelle are rolls of lamb offal wrapped in endive leaves tied with casings of the same lamb.

See also 
 Arrosticini
 Italian cuisine
 List of Italian dishes
 List of lamb dishes
 Cuisine of Abruzzo

References 

Lamb dishes
Italian cuisine
Cuisine of Abruzzo